The Woman Who Fooled Herself is a 1922 American silent romantic drama film directed by Charles A. Logue and starring May Allison, Robert Ellis and Frank Currier.

Cast
 May Allison as Eva Lee
 Robert Ellis as Fernando Pennington
 Frank Currier as 	Don Fernando Casablanca
 Bessie Wharton as Doña Marie Pennington
 Robert Schable as Cameron Camden
 Louis Dean as Eban Burnham
 Rafael Arcos as	The Padre

References

Bibliography
 Munden, Kenneth White. The American Film Institute Catalog of Motion Pictures Produced in the United States, Part 1. University of California Press, 1997.

External links

1922 films
1922 drama films
Films directed by Charles A. Logue
American silent feature films
American black-and-white films
Associated Exhibitors films
1920s English-language films
1920s American films
Silent American drama films